{{DISPLAYTITLE:C10H15N}}
The molecular formula C10H15N (molar mass: 149.23 g/mol, exact mass: 149.1204 u) may refer to:

 Diethylaniline
 N,N-Dimethylphenethylamine
 α-Ethylphenethylamine
 Isopropylbenzylamine
 Levomethamphetamine
 Methamphetamine
 3-Methylamphetamine
 4-Methylamphetamine
 Ortetamine
 Phenpromethamine
 Phentermine
 2-Phenyl-3-aminobutane